Ryan Shwayder, commonly known by his pseudonym Blackguard, is a prolific online game designer who is known both for his work on massively multiplayer games as well as his writings on the subject of game development. He currently works for the Curt Schilling-lead game company in Massachusetts known as 38 Studios, alongside author R.A. Salvatore and artist Todd McFarlane.

Biography
Shwayder got his start on the media side of the industry, running fan sites for specific games and writing for various gaming press sites on the web. He began his career in the online gaming industry working on a short-lived MMORTS called Fighting Legends, and later obtained a position at Sony Online Entertainment in San Diego. He finished his tenure at SOE in late 2006 as Community Relations Manager for EverQuest II, and was hired by development startup Green Monster Games to become a Game Designer and Community Relations Manager.

He gained much of his popularity in the massively multi-player gaming community by running a commentary site about game development and design called Nerfbat, as well as game development discussion forums known as the MMO Round Table. Ryan has also volunteered his time with local IGDA chapters, most recently in San Diego.

After Green Monster Games, Ryan became a quest designer on the World of Warcraft team at Blizzard Entertainment.

Games

 Fighting Legends (Maximum Charisma Studios, 2001)
 EverQuest II (Sony Online Entertainment, 2004)
 EverQuest II: The Bloodline Chronicles (Sony Online Entertainment, Adventure Pack, 2005)
 EverQuest II: The Splitpaw Saga (Sony Online Entertainment, Adventure Pack, 2005)
 EverQuest II: Desert of Flames (Sony Online Entertainment, Expansion Pack, 2005)
 EverQuest II: Kingdom of Sky (Sony Online Entertainment, Expansion Pack, 2006)
 EverQuest II: The Fallen Dynasty (Sony Online Entertainment, Adventure Pack, 2006)
 EverQuest II: Echoes of Faydwer (Sony Online Entertainment, Expansion Pack, 2006)

External links
 Ryan Shwayder's Website (Nerfbat)
 MMO Round Table
 38 Studios Website
 Ryan at MobyGames
 How to Win Friends and Influence Gamers (The Escapist)
 Ryan Shwayder's Bio
 How Blackguard Got Into the Industry

Video game designers
American video game designers
1982 births
Living people